The Peceneaga (also: Aiorman) is a river in Romania, right tributary of the Danube. It flows into Lake Peceneaga, which is connected with the Danube, in the village Peceneaga.

References

Rivers of Romania
Rivers of Tulcea County